The Xinying Cultural Center is a cultural center in Xinying District, Tainan, Taiwan.

History
The construction of the cultural center building began in 1981 and it was opened on 8 October 1983 as the Tainan County Cultural Center. On 12 August 1985, the interior facilities of the music hall began to be engineered and started to be used on 19 April 1986. In 2010, the center was entirely renovated and renamed Xinying Cultural Center. It was then officially reopened in June 2011.

Architecture
 Artifact Display Room
 Gallery
 Cultural Activities Room
 Music Hall and Plaza
 Administration Office
 Auditorium

Transportation
The cultural center is accessible within walking distance west from Xinying Station of Taiwan Railways.

See also
 List of tourist attractions in Taiwan

References

External links

 

1983 establishments in Taiwan
Cultural centers in Tainan
Event venues established in 1983